The 2020 Campeonato Paulista de Futebol Profissional da Primeira Divisão - Série A1 was the 119th season of São Paulo's top professional football league.

Format
In the first stage the sixteen teams were drawn, with seeding, into four groups of four teams each, with each team playing once against the twelve clubs from the other three groups. After each team had played twelve matches, the top two teams of each group qualified for the quarter-final stage.
After the completion of the first stage, the two clubs with the lowest number of points, regardless of the group, were relegated to the Campeonato Paulista Série A2.
Quarter-finals, semi-finals and finals were played in a two-legged home and away fixture, with the best placed first stage team playing the second leg at home.
In case of a draw in any knockout stage match, the winner was decided via a penalty shoot-out.
The two highest-placed teams not otherwise qualified qualified for the 2021 Copa do Brasil.
The top three highest-placed teams in the general table at the end of the competition who were not playing in any level of the national Brazilian football league system qualified for the 2021 Campeonato Brasileiro Série D.

Tiebreakers
The teams were ranked according to points (3 points for a win, 1 point for a draw, 0 points for a loss). If two or more teams were equal on points on completion of the group matches, the following criteria were applied to determine the rankings:
Higher number of wins;
Superior goal difference;
Higher number of goals scored;
Fewest red cards received;
Fewest yellow cards received;
Draw in the headquarters of the FPF.

Teams

Red Bull took over Clube Atlético Bragantino, which resulted in the relegation of Red Bull Brasil to the second tier. Água Santa was awarded the qualification to Série A1 
Source: Regulamento do Paulistão 2020

First stage

Group A

Group B

Group C

Group D

Knockout stage

Bracket

Overall table

Awards

Team of the Year

Player of the Year
The Player of the Year was awarded to Artur of Red Bull Bragantino.

Young Player of the Year
The Young Player of the Year was awarded to Patrick of Palmeiras.

Countryside Best Player of the Year
The Countryside Best Player of the Year was awarded to Artur of Red Bull Bragantino.

Top Scorer of the Season
The top scorer of the season was Ytalo, who scored seven goals for Red Bull Bragantino.

Top scorers

References

Campeonato Paulista seasons
Paulista
Campeonato Paulista 2020